Bavajikkottai is a village in the Pattukkottai taluk of Thanjavur district, Tamil Nadu, India.

Demographics 

As per the 2001 census, Bavajikkottai had a total population of 853 with 412 males and 441 females. The sex ratio was 1070. The literacy rate was 68.81.

References 

 

Villages in Thanjavur district